Grace Huang is a Taiwanese-Australian actress of Cantonese descent, best known for her role as the Gemini Female in the RZA directed martial arts film, The Man with the Iron Fists.

Career 
Huang starred as Mei Chen in the pilot for the 2013 CBS TV series Intelligence, and plays May in the Hong Kong action film Cold War starring Aaron Kwok, Andy Lau and Tony Leung Ka-fai. She is also starring as Bunny in the Hong Kong comedy-romance film Love in Space, and as Jenny in the Hong Kong Action film Overheard alongside Daniel Wu, Michael Wong, Sean Lau, which is directed by Felix Chong and Alan Mak.

Huang won a Best Actress award at the HollyShorts Film Festival for her portrayal of the character Ava Chen in Jennifer Thym's vampire-and-angel action short film, Bloodtraffick. A frequent collaborator with Thym on several other projects, she is involved in the Hong Kong-set feature film Jasmine in which Huang stars in alongside Byron Mann, Jason Tobin, Brian Yang, Sarah Lian, and Eugenia Yuan and in which Thym produced and Dax Phelan directed. In 2013, she played the role of a love interest to Sean Faris in Lost for Words.

Apart from being active in Australian and Hong Kong cinema, Huang has also appeared in the Taiwanese Golden Bell Award-winning television drama "Friends". She frequently appears in print and TV ad campaigns for Vidal Sassoon, Neutrogena, Canon, HSBC and the Australian Tourism Board, and has been featured on the covers of magazines such as Vogue, Harper's Bazaar, FHM, Oyster, Elle, and Marie Claire.

Filmography

References

External links

 
 Grace Huang's Official Page
 Grace Huang on AlivenotDead
 Grace Huang on Twitter
 Schema Magazine: Grace Huang | A Force to be Reckoned With (Interview)

Australian film actresses
Australian expatriates in Hong Kong
Living people
21st-century Australian actresses
Actresses from Sydney
Australian television actresses
Australian people of Chinese descent
1977 births
Australian actresses of Asian descent